Bernard Belle (November 12, 1964 – June 23, 2022) was an American composer, record producer, and musician. After starting his career as an R&B guitarist, Belle became known as a songwriter for Michael Jackson and Whitney Houston and a producer of gospel music.

Career 
Belle grew up in Englewood, New Jersey, and performed as a musician while still a student at Dwight Morrow High School.

Belle received his first break in the late 1980s. His sister, Regina Belle, a Grammy Award-winning singer who was providing background vocals for R&B group The Manhattans at the time, recommended him to play guitar for the group.

Bernard Belle is notable for his partnership with producer Teddy Riley and his collaborations with Michael Jackson.  He is credited with writing and co-writing "Remember the Time", "Privacy" and "Why You Wanna Trip on Me".

He began working with Teddy Riley in 1986. Together, they became the pioneers of the new jack swing era of music. He wrote and produced for, among others, Whitney Houston, Bobby Brown, Patti LaBelle, Aaron Hall, Keith Sweat, Al B. Sure!, and Today.

After dedicating his life to Christ in 1994, Belle still remained one of the most sought after producer/musicians in the Gospel music industry. He performed with Donnie McClurkin, Shirley Caesar, Richard Smallwood, Marvin Sapp, Fred Hammond, Yolanda Adams, Tye Tribbett, Mary Mary, Kirk Franklin, Donald Lawrence, Smokie Norful, Hezekiah Walker and BeBe & CeCe Winans.

He was a recurring musician on the BET gospel shows Sunday Best and The Celebration of Gospel.

Belle's name appears on over 70 million records worldwide as a producer, writer, or musician. He received four Grammy Awards, an American Music Award, two Soul Train Music Awards, over a dozen ASCAP Awards, and nominations for Stella and GMA Dove Awards.

Personal life
Belle married his long time love Debra Belle in November 1995. Belle had five children.

A longtime resident of Teaneck, New Jersey, Belle died on June 23, 2022, at the age of 57 of congestive heart failure.

Discography

References

External links

Sunday Best
The Celebration of Gospel

1964 births
2022 deaths
20th-century African-American musicians
21st-century African-American musicians
Dwight Morrow High School alumni
People from Englewood, New Jersey
People from Teaneck, New Jersey
Musicians from New Jersey